Dark Places may refer to:

 Dark Places (novel), a mystery novel by Gillian Flynn
 Dark Places (1973 film), a 1973 British horror film
 Dark Places (2015 film), a 2015 mystery film, based on the Flynn novel
 "Dark Places" (song), a 2019 song by Beck from his album Hyperspace
 "Dark Places", a song by Hollywood Undead from Day of the Dead